Cui Yuan (77–142 or 78–143 AD), courtesy name Ziyu, Chinese calligrapher, mathematician, philosopher, poet, and politician during the Eastern Han dynasty. He was a temporary fugitive who was also known for his many written works, although in political life he became involved in court intrigues which damaged his career.

Life
Cui Yuan was born in the Lecheng Commandery (renamed Anping in 122) in what is now modern Hebei province. He was the son of Cui Yin, who died while Yuan was in his teens. After years of study, he ventured to the Han capital at Luoyang when he was eighteen. There he studied under Jia Kui and befriended notable persons such as the poet and politician Ma Rong (79–166) and the polymathic scientist Zhang Heng (78–139). Cui gained a reputation as a mathematician with his work on reforming the Chinese calendar and as a scholar following his commentary on the I Ching.

Notes

References
Chen, Shou (1999). Empresses and Consorts: Selections from Chen Shou's Records of the Three States with Pei Songzhi's Commentary. Translated with annotations and introduction by Robert Joe Cutter and William Gordon Crowell. Honolulu: University of Hawai'i Press. .
Crespigny, Rafe de. (2007). A Biographical Dictionary of Later Han to the Three Kingdoms (23-220 AD). Leiden: Koninklijke Brill. .

143 deaths
1st-century Chinese calligraphers
2nd-century Chinese poets
2nd-century Chinese calligraphers
Ancient Chinese mathematicians
Chinese non-fiction writers
Cui clan of Boling
Han dynasty calligraphers
Han dynasty philosophers
Han dynasty poets
Han dynasty politicians from Hebei
Han dynasty writers from Hebei
Mathematicians from Hebei
Poets from Hebei
Politicians from Hengshui
Year of birth uncertain